Arne Martin Klausen (19 December 1927 – 15 June 2018) was a Norwegian social anthropologist.

Klausen was born in Porsgrunn as a son of Klaus Martinius Klausen and Anna Olsen. He was appointed professor at the University of Oslo from 1973. Among his publications are Kerala Fishermen and the Indo-Norwegian Pilot Project from 1968, on the foreign aid Indo-Norwegian Project, and several studies related to the 1994 Winter Olympics at Lillehammer. He is a member of the Norwegian Academy of Science and Letters.

References

1927 births
2018 deaths
People from Porsgrunn
Norwegian anthropologists
Social anthropologists
Academic staff of the University of Oslo
Members of the Norwegian Academy of Science and Letters